The Grafton Academy of Fashion Design is a third level college based in Dublin, Ireland. It offers an undergraduate 3-year full-time Diploma course in Fashion Design as well as short courses in Fashion Design, dressmaking, pattern drafting, garment construction, millinery, art and design on a full or part-time basis.

History 
The Grafton Academy of Fashion Design was founded in 1938 by Pauline Elizabeth Keller Clotworthy. Born in 1912, Clotworthy was brought up in a large house in Glenageary, with several generations of family around her. Pauline showed a keen interest in sketching and writing and went on to study at Dublin's Metropolitan School of Art (now the National College of Art and Design). It was there that one of her tutors, artist Seán Keating cautioned her on turning her life drawing into fashion illustrations, this only encouraged her to go on to study the art of representing fabrics and textures using watercolour in Browns Paris School of Fashion in London. Upon her return to Dublin, Clotworthy was advised by Arnotts department store manager Ronald Nesbit, to further educate herself on how to realise her fashion drawings. She returned to London to train at the British institute of Dress Designing (Hardy Amies was a fellow student). Understanding that she had benefited from an education that was not available in Ireland, she decided she wanted to share the skills she had acquired. Shortly after graduating in 1938, Clotworthy established the Grafton Academy, Ireland's first design school and within a year it had staged its debut show. Early graduates from the college include Neilli Mulcahy, Ib Jorgensen and Clodagh Phillips, all of whom made a significant contribution in promoting Irish fashion culture, both home and abroad.

As of 2018, the Grafton Academy is managed by Clotworthy's daughter Suzanne Marr.

Alumni 
Alumni of the college include:

 Louise Kennedy
 Paul Costelloe
 Liz Quinn
 Carolyn Donnelly
 Sharon Hoey
 Patrick Casey
 Ib Jorgensen
 Neilli Mulcahy
 Clodagh Phillips 
 Richard Lewis
 Lorcan Mullany (Bellville Sassoon Lorcan Mullany)
 Sean Byrne
 Umit Kutluk
 Emma Manley
 Jacqueline Quinn

References

External links
 Grafton Academy of Fashion Design website

Further education colleges in Dublin (city)
Fashion schools
Irish fashion